The Labor Council of New South Wales, branded Unions NSW, is the peak body for trade unions in the state of New South Wales, Australia. As of 2005 there are 67 unions and 8 Rural and Regional Trades & Labor Councils affiliated to the Labor Council, representing 800,000 workers in NSW. It is registered as the State Peak Council of Employees under Section 215 of the Industrial Relations Act 1996 (NSW). The council is affiliated with the Australian Council of Trade Unions (ACTU).

History
The Labor Council was formed by six unions in 1871, and originally called the Trades & Labor Council of Sydney. The council experienced rapid growth during its early history, with the number of affiliated unions tripling between 1885 and 1890, and total membership reaching 35,000 in that year, or 60% of union members in the Colony of New South Wales. By 1891, 21.5% of all employees in the colony were union members, making it the most organised workforce in the world. Union organisation in the colony suffered badly during the economic depression of the 1890s, due to high unemployment, aggressive anti-union policies of employers and a number of large, unsuccessful strikes including the 1890 Australian maritime dispute and the 1891 Australian shearers strike.

In 1894, the Trades & Labor Council of Sydney changed its name to the Sydney District of Australasian Labour Federation. In 1900, it again changed its name to the Sydney Labor Council, changing again eight years later to the Labor Council of New South Wales. In 2005, it adopted the brand name UnionsNSW for all public purposes, but retained the official name Labor Council of New South Wales.

Responsibilities
The Labor Council of New South Wales is responsible for:

 implementing Australian Council of Trade Unions policy within New South Wales
 co-ordinating union activities and campaigns, involving more than one union
 providing assistance with research, negotiations and advocacy to affiliated organisations
 lobbying State Parliament for social and industrial reforms
 providing a public point of contact for general enquiries on New South Wales unions
 management of the Sydney Trades Hall, which was transferred in 2002 to the Labor Council from the original trustees, the Trades Hall Association.

Labor Council Secretaries

See also

 Unions ACT
 Victorian Trades Hall Council

References

External links
 

Trades councils
Trade unions established in 1871
Trade unions in New South Wales